The Former McLean County Courthouse in Washburn, North Dakota was built in 1905 to replace a courthouse that had burned down, and was used as a courthouse until 1917, when the new McLean County Courthouse was built.

The building is now used as one of the buildings of the McLean County Historical Society Museums.

It was listed on the National Register of Historic Places in 1985.

References

External links
 McLean County Historical Society Museums

Courthouses on the National Register of Historic Places in North Dakota
County courthouses in North Dakota
Colonial Revival architecture in North Dakota
Government buildings completed in 1905
Former courthouses in the United States
Museums in McLean County, North Dakota
National Register of Historic Places in McLean County, North Dakota
1905 establishments in North Dakota
Historical societies in North Dakota